On with the Motley is a 1920 silent Italian drama film directed by Carmine Gallone.

Cast
 Soava Gallone as Alessandra di Tranda
 Elisa Severi as Sua madre
 Maurice De Grunewald
 Angelo Gallina
 Tatiana Gorka
 Luciano Molinari as Frere Ivre
 Renato Piacentini
 Umberto Zanuccoli

References

External links
 

1920 films
1920 drama films
Italian drama films
Italian silent feature films
Italian black-and-white films
Films directed by Carmine Gallone
Silent drama films
1920s Italian films